SeaTools is a computer hard disk analysis software developed and released by Seagate Technology. It exists as a version for DOS (bundled in a bootable medium with FreeDOS) and Microsoft Windows. It can perform short and long drive self-tests and read/write tests, extract S.M.A.R.T. indicators and drive information, and perform advanced tests. It was created by Seagate in response to the fact that more than one third of all drives sent in for repair were actually not defective at all, thus creating unnecessary costs for retailers and the company by having to ship and analyze such disks.

SeaTools for DOS
SeaTools for DOS comes in a package with the FreeDOS operating system. It can be downloaded as a bootable ISO image from the Seagate website.

SeaTools for Windows
The Windows version of SeaTools supports any hard disk regardless of manufacturer. It supports analysis for disks connected via PATA/SATA, USB, IEEE 1394, SAS and SCSI.

SeaTools Enterprise
The enterprise edition is still provided as a legacy version for Seagate hard disks only. It supports only SCSI or Fibre Channel drives and is designed for use with servers and workstations by supporting tests of multiple drives simultaneously as well as sequentially.

References

See also
 Smartmontools

Hard disk software
Utilities for Windows
DOS software